Kaneyama may refer to:
Kaneyama, Fukushima, a town in Fukushima Prefecture, Japan
Kaneyama, Gifu, formerly a town in Gifu Prefecture, Japan
Kaneyama, Yamagata, a town in Yamagata Prefecture, Japan